Newport is a town in Carteret County, North Carolina, United States. The population was 4,510 at the 2010 census.

History
Newport was officially chartered in 1866. Although the crossroads community on the Newport River was known by that name decades earlier, the area was also known as Bell's Corner and Shepardsville in earlier years. It was the location of the Newport Barracks, a Union camp during the American Civil War.

It was also called Shepardsville, in the early 18th century, for Shepard, a local landowner.  The naming of “Newport” can be traced to two prevalent theories: the town was called "New Port” to distinguish it from the “Old Port “ of Beaufort, N.C.; and the early influx of Quakers from Rhode Island called the town “Newport” in honor of their native Newport, R.I.Town of Newport, NC web page

Early industry included agriculture, logging, and naval stores, including turpentine production. During the town's early history, the Newport River was navigable all the way to Old Topsail Inlet, now known as Beaufort Inlet, which opens to the Atlantic Ocean. The town was home to one of the earliest organized churches in Carteret County, the Newport River Primitive Baptist Church, established 1778. The structure was burned near the end of the Civil War but was soon rebuilt on Church Street and remains active today.

In 1858, the Atlantic and North Carolina Railroad was completed when the final  stretch of rail from Goldsboro through Newport to Beaufort was laid. The community is also the site of numerous Civil War battlefields, forts, and strategic locations. Newport was occupied by Union forces for much of the war.

Part of the town's residential area known as the "housing project" was originally developed as housing for civil service employees and military serving at nearby Marine Corps Air Station Cherry Point.

Newport today
The town government operates as a council–manager government form with a mayor, a town manager, and a five-member town council. The current mayor of Newport is Dennis Barber. Jeanne Benedict, David Heath (Mayor Pro Tempore), Mark Eadie, Danny Fornes, and Rhonda Shinn serve on the town council. Members serve staggered terms.

The town is protected by a paid fire department with an active volunteer force, founded in the 1940s by Leon Mann, Jr. The department also provides emergency medical and ambulance services.

Public schools in Newport include the Carteret Pre-K Center, Newport Elementary School, and Newport Middle School. Newport Consolidated School, a first-through-12th-grade school established in 1926, was demolished in 1966 after the county completed construction of a new consolidated high school, West Carteret High in nearby Morehead City. Members of the Newport Consolidated School Alumni Association operate a small school museum in a depot warehouse owned by the North Carolina Railroad in Newport.

Geography

Newport is located in west-central Carteret County at  (34.787705, -76.866585). U.S. Route 70, a four-lane highway, passes through the town west of the center; it leads southeast  to Morehead City and north  to Havelock.

Industry

Newport is home to several industries that export usable products to all parts of the United States.  The Frank Door Company manufactures cold storage doors and double acting doors for new and existing installations.  Having been in business since 1982, Frank Door has manufactured doors completely on-site and is currently expanding its operation to match its growth.

Also, at home in Newport, you'll find Veneer Technologies (Veneer Tech). At Veneer Tech, they make veneers for applications such as furniture, countertops, and other uses.  The real wood veneers are banded, glued, and manufactured on-site to the customer's needs.

Demographics

2020 census

As of the 2020 United States census, there were 4,364 people, 1,772 households, and 1,161 families residing in the town.

2000 census
As of the census of 2000, there were 3,349 people, 1,136 households, and 831 families residing in the town. The population density was 456.0 people per square mile (175.9/km). There were 1,232 housing units at an average density of 167.7 per square mile (64.7/km). The racial makeup of the town was 83.13% White, 11.94% African American, 0.63% Native American, 1.28% Asian, 0.03% Pacific Islander, 1.43% from other races, and 1.55% from two or more races. Hispanic or Latino of any race were 3.70% of the population.

There were 1,136 households, out of which 36.9% had children under the age of 18 living with them, 58.8% were married couples living together, 10.4% had a female householder with no husband present, and 26.8% were non-families. 23.2% of all households were made up of individuals, and 7.3% had someone living alone who was 65 years of age or older. The average household size was 2.58, and the average family size was 3.04.

In the town, the population was spread out, with 24.6% under the age of 18, 7.4% from 18 to 24, 32.5% from 25 to 44, 22.4% from 45 to 64, and 13.1% who were 65 years of age or older. The median age was 37 years. For every 100 females, there were 107.1 males. For every 100 females age 18 and over, there were 109.5 males.

The median income for a household in the town was $36,629, and the median income for a family was $43,147. Males had a median income of $30,408 versus $17,063 for females. The per capita income for the town was $14,260. About 6.6% of families and 10.0% of the population were below the poverty line, including 12.8% of those under age 18 and 10.6% of those age 65 or over.

References

External links

Town of Newport official website

Towns in Carteret County, North Carolina
Towns in North Carolina
Populated places established in 1778